Andrzej Grabarczyk (born 31 May 1953 in Włodawa, Poland) is a Polish actor. His father, Wincenty Grabarczyk, is a veteran actor and theatrical director. In 1978, Andrzej completed study at the Warsaw State College Of Theatrical Arts.

Filmography
 "Czernaja metka" (2003)
 "Stare srebra" (2003)
 "Marzenia do spełnienia" (2001)
 "Kiler-ów 2-óch" (1999) as Prezydent RP
 "Matki, żony i kochanki II" (1998) as Leon
 "Sto minut wakacji" (1998)
 "Ucieczka" (1997) as Pal
 "Klan" (1997) as Jerzy Chojnicki
 "Tabatière de l'empereur, La" (1995)
 "Dwa Światy" (English: "Spellbinder", 1994) as Bron
 "Oczy niebieskie" (1994)
 "Fitness Club" (1994–95) Stanisław Murasz
 "Spółka rodzinna" (1994) as agent State Protection Office
 "Ptaszka" (1994) as Lisiecki, also Ptaszki
 "Czterdziestolatek - dwadzieścia lat później" (1993) as police sergeant
 "Pajęczarki" (1993) as Hotel detective
 "Nowe przygody Arsena Lupin" (1993) as police officer
 "Do widzenia wczoraj. Dwie krótkie komedie o zmianie systemu" (1993) as Kościelny from the funeral at Władysława
 "Jacek" (1993)
 "Pamiętnik znaleziony w garbie" (1992) as Francik
 "Żegnaj Rockefeller" (1992) as police inspector
 "Tajna Misja" (1992) as Tomasz
 "Panny i wdowy" (1991) as security man
 "V.I.P." (1991) as Delekty secretary
 "Powodzenia, żołnierzyku" (1991) as Xavier
 "Pogranicze w ogniu" (1991) as Peter
 "Prominent (Eminent Domain)" (1990) as Marek, kierowca Burskiego
 "Historia niemoralna" (1990) as Kazio
 "Urodzony po raz trzeci" (1989) as Leopold Wójcik
 "Lawa" (1989) as Zenon Niemojewski
 "Stan strachu" (1989)
 "Sztuka kochania" (1989) as taxi driver
 "Po własnym pogrzebie" (1989) as Leopold Wójcik
 "W labiryncie" (1988) as officer Militia
 "Obywatel Piszczyk" (1988) as Renata colleague
 "Powrót do Polski" (1988) as Jan Maciaszek
 "Oszołomienie" (1988) as actor/singer
 "Chichot Pana Boga" (1988) as security man
 "Co to konia obchodzi?" (1987)
 "Zabij mnie glino" (1987) as Jachimowski
 "Rajska jabłoń" (1985) as Andrzej
 "Lubię nietoperze" (1985) as gardener
 "111 dni letargu" (1984) as Więzień
 "Przybłęda" (1984)
 "Umarłem, aby żyć" (1984) as Leopold Wójcik
 "Fachowiec" (1983)
 "Na straży swej stać będę" (1983) as Paulek
 "Życie Kamila Kuranta" (1982) as Mieciek
 "Blisko, coraz bliżej" (1982–86) as Tadeusz Pasternik, son Franciszka
 "Był jazz" (1981) as Witek
 "Dziecinne pytania" (1981) as Maciek from TV
 "Dom" (1980) as Politechniki student
 "Punkt widzenia" (1980)
 "Grzeszny żywot Franciszka Buły" (1980) as Franciszek Buła

Polish dubbing
 "The Terminal" (2004) as Viktor Navorski (Tom Hanks)

External links
 
 Biography In Polish

1953 births
Living people
People from Włodawa
Polish male television actors
20th-century Polish male actors
Polish male soap opera actors